Jereny Espinal (born 3 October 1997) is a Puerto Rican handball player who plays for the club Santa Isabel Handball. She is member of the Puerto Rican national team. She competed at the 2015 World Women's Handball Championship in Denmark.

References

1997 births
Living people
Puerto Rican female handball players
Handball players at the 2015 Pan American Games
Pan American Games competitors for Puerto Rico
21st-century Puerto Rican women